Harald Jensen (born 18 December 1966) is a Norwegian sport shooter competing in Skeet. Jensen won the gold medal at both the ISSF World Shooting Championships and the ISSF European Shooting Championships in 2002. He finished as number six at the 2004 Summer Olympics.

References

1966 births
Norwegian male sport shooters
Skeet shooters
Shooters at the 1992 Summer Olympics
Shooters at the 1996 Summer Olympics
Shooters at the 2000 Summer Olympics
Shooters at the 2004 Summer Olympics
Shooters at the 2008 Summer Olympics
Olympic shooters of Norway
Living people
20th-century Norwegian people
21st-century Norwegian people